Vălcani (often spelled Valcani; ;) is a commune in Timiș County, Romania. It is composed of a single village, Vălcani. An independent commune from 1877 to 1968, it was a village of Dudeștii Vechi commune from that year until 2005, when it again became independent.

Geography 
Vălcani is located in the west of Timiș County, in the Aranca Plain, on the border with Serbia. It is comprised between Dudeștii Vechi commune in the east and north and Teremia Mare commune in the south. It is located 82 km from Timișoara and about 20 km from Sânnicolau Mare, the nearest town. 

The surface hydrographic network is represented by the Aranca River and the older branches of the Mureș River, Mureșan and Țiganca streams.

History 

The first data about Valcani appear in documents from 1256, when it was called Kyuolkan, being inhabited by blaci (Romanians) and biseni (probably Pechenegs). After the annexation of Banat by Hungary, the estate was sold to the Batthyány family, and in 1850 Simon Sinas became the owner. He later sold the property to several owners.

The first inhabitants settled in the part of the village known as Grădini ("Gardens"), about 300–400 m from the Aranca River, between Dudeștii Vechi and the current hearth of the village, being called Vălcaniul de Sus ("Upper Vălcani"). Later, as a result of the increase in the number of inhabitants, the population expanded downstream on Aranca, in the area known today as Șuștreni, being called Vălcaniul de Jos ("Lower Vălcani"). During the Ottoman rule, other neighborhoods appeared, such as Carafala.

The main occupation of the inhabitants was sheep breeding, but over time they began to cultivate the land. In 1736 the locality is divided in two, a part is ceded in order to colonize with Romanian population from Transylvania, Caraș and Severin, and a part is leased. At the beginning of the 20th century, the locality had 720 houses and 4,829 inhabitants, respectively.

Vălcani commune was first established in 1877 and functioned as an administrative unit until 1968, when it was abolished, being attached to Dudeștii Vechi commune. Following a local referendum held in 2004, Vălcani commune was re-established, consisting of a single village.

Demographics 

Vălcani had a population of 1,350 inhabitants at the 2011 census, up 3% from the 2002 census. Most inhabitants are Romanians (93.63%), with a minority of Hungarians (2.52%). For 2.67% of the population, ethnicity is unknown. By religion, most inhabitants are Orthodox (91.11%), but there are also minorities of Roman Catholics (2.89%) and Pentecostals (1.11%). For 2.74% of the population, religious affiliation is unknown.

Notable people 
 Grațian Sepi (1910–1977), footballer

Notes

References 

Communes in Timiș County
Localities in Romanian Banat